Dolores Hernández Monzon (born 21 May 1997, in Veracruz, Veracruz) is a competitive diver from Mexico.

Hernández competed at the 2015 Pan American Games, where she won a gold medal in the synchronized 3 metre springboard event alongside Paola Espinosa, and a bronze medal in the individual 3 metre springboard competition.

She competed at the 2015 World Aquatics Championships.

See also
 Mexico at the 2015 World Aquatics Championships

References

External links
Bio

1997 births
Living people
Mexican female divers
Sportspeople from Veracruz
People from Veracruz (city)
Divers at the 2015 Pan American Games
Pan American Games gold medalists for Mexico
Pan American Games bronze medalists for Mexico
Divers at the 2016 Summer Olympics
Olympic divers of Mexico
Pan American Games medalists in diving
Central American and Caribbean Games gold medalists for Mexico
Competitors at the 2014 Central American and Caribbean Games
Universiade medalists in diving
Universiade gold medalists for Mexico
Divers at the 2019 Pan American Games
Central American and Caribbean Games medalists in diving
Medalists at the 2017 Summer Universiade
Medalists at the 2019 Summer Universiade
Medalists at the 2015 Pan American Games
Medalists at the 2019 Pan American Games
Divers at the 2020 Summer Olympics
21st-century Mexican women